Ronning Gardens, located in a remote location near the northwest tip of Vancouver Island, British Columbia, Canada,  were established by Norwegian settler Bernt Ronning around 1910.

After he died in 1963, Ronning's garden was reclaimed by the temperate rainforest of northern Vancouver Island. However, some years later the property was purchased and the new owners began restoring the gardens.

Nearby communities
 Holberg
 Winter Harbour

See also

 Cape Scott Provincial Park

References
 Vancouver Island Garden Trail
  Regional District of Mount Waddington
 Historical notes & photos

Unincorporated settlements in British Columbia
Quatsino Sound region
Populated places in the Regional District of Mount Waddington
Gardens in Canada
Norwegian Canadian settlements